Susan Williams is a historian and author, based in London. Her latest book is White Malice: The CIA and the Covert Recolonization of Africa, published in 2021. Her other publications include: The People's King: The True Story of the Abdication, a book about the abdication of Edward VIII, published in 2003;  and Colour Bar: The Triumph of Seretse Khama and His Nation, published in 2006, on which the 2016 film A United Kingdom is based. 

Her book Who Killed Hammarskjold? (2011), about the death in 1961 of the then-United Nations Secretary-General, Dag Hammarskjöld, triggered a new UN investigation in 2015.

In Spies in the Congo: America's Atomic Mission in World War II. she tells the intricate tale of a special unit of the US Office of Strategic Services (OSS), the forerunner of the CIA, that was set up to purchase and secretly remove all the uranium from the unique uranium mine in Katanga province Shinkolobwe in Belgian Congo that the US could get its hands on and keep out of the hands of the Axis powers. The uranium was to be used in the bombing of Hiroshima and Nagasaki.

Williams is a senior research fellow at the Institute of Commonwealth Studies, University of London.

Books 
 White Malice: The CIA and the Covert Recolonization of Africa, PublicAffairs, 2021. 
 Spies in the Congo: America’s Atomic Mission in World War II, PublicAffairs, 2016. 
 Who Killed Hammarskjöld? The UN, the Cold War, and White Supremacy in Africa, London: Hurst, 2011. 
 Colour Bar: The Triumph of Seretse Khama and His Nation, Allen Lane, 2006.  – on the founding president of Botswana
 The People’s King: The True Story of the Abdication, Allen Lane, 2003.  – on the abdication of Edward VIII 
 Ladies of influence: women of the elite in interwar Britain, Allen Lane, 2000.

References

External links 
 Official website

1953 births
Living people
21st-century British historians
21st-century British women writers
Academics of the Institute of Commonwealth Studies, London
British women biographers
British women historians
Historians of the Democratic Republic of the Congo